Yann Fricheteau (born 14 June 1979) is a French former luger. He competed in the men's singles event at the 2002 Winter Olympics.

References

External links
 

1979 births
Living people
French male lugers
Olympic lugers of France
Lugers at the 2002 Winter Olympics
Sportspeople from Loiret